Sir Patrick Joseph Henry Hannon FRGS FRSA (1874 - 10 January 1963) was an Irish-born Conservative and Unionist Party politician, industrialist and agriculturalist. “one of parliaments most colourful characters”. He served as Member of Parliament (MP) for Birmingham Moseley from 1921 to 1950 and was active in the British Commonwealth Union. Born in Taverane, Cloonloo near Kilfree Junction, County Sligo in 1874.  Hannon was the eldest son of Matthew Hannon of Kilfree. His father was a poor farmer and Sir Patrick would go on to offer great support for Irish workers and agriculture.

Education and early work 
Times were extremely tough but Patrick Hannon was determined to secure education by walking to several schools including Deerpark, at the foot of the Curlew mountains, and Townaghbrack. He later saved turf in the summertime and walked with his donkey to the town of Boyle loaded with two creels of produce which he sold for two old pence per creel before walking home to repeat the act, a feat necessary to fund his further education at the Royal University of Ireland and elsewhere. (The Royal University was a degree-awarding body that operated in what is now Newman house on St. Stephen’s green between 1880 and 1909. It was succeeded by the National University of Ireland in 1909. It awarded degrees to University College, Dublin with which it was collocated on St Stephen’s Green as well as to other colleges and schools. University College was the successor to the Catholic University, established by Cardinal Newman. From 1882, it was administered by the Jesuits. The examinations and the awarding of degrees were carried out by the fellows (teachers) of University College on behalf of the Royal University.)He was educated at the Royal College of Science and Royal University of Ireland. He joined the staff of the Midland Great Western Railway in 1887 as a goods clerk in Loughrea, Co. Galway, where he met and formed a lifelong friendship with the famous Irish poet and playwright, William Butler Yeats.

Hannon was actively involved in Irish agriculture from 1896 to 1904, in particular as an officer of the Irish Agricultural Organisation Society. He worked from 1896 to 1904 in the fledgling Irish CoOperative Movement, traveling the country setting up, often in the face of great opposition, local creameries. From 1901 to 1904 Hannon was Director of the Irish Agricultural Wholesale Society and reported on agriculture worldwide. On graduation, his first job was with the Irish Agricultural Organisational Society ( the umbrella body for the fledgling co-operative movement in Ireland ) excelling in advancing the movement. He then joined the Irish Agricultural Wholesale Society – later to become Greencore and later still part of the giant food group today named Aryzta. From 1902 to 1907 he visited the United States and Canada on behalf of the Irish Industrial Movement. From 1907 to 1909 he was Director of Agricultural Organisation to the government of Cape Colony and a Justice of the Peace. He married Mary, daughter of Thomas J Wynne of Castlebar.

Politics
Described in The New York Times obituary as “one of parliaments" most colourful characters”, he was also a leading industrialist in Britain and the Conservative and Unionist member of parliament for Moseley between 1921-1950.
In 1910, after time spent in South Africa, Sir Patrick moved to England. Hannon contested Bristol East in 1910 as a Unionist. In the period 1910 to 1914, he was an officer of the Tariff Reform League.  He was first elected as a Coalition Unionist in a by-election on 4 March 1921 and entered the House of Commons on 4 March 1921, serving Moseley for almost thirty years. He was also president of the Ideal Benefit Society, helping working-class people buy their first homes, and among his other local achievements were his efforts to support ex-servicemen and records testify to Hannon’s lobbying for “motor cars provided for seriously disabled pensioners which have been allotted to Birmingham” and for those “available for the Haig Homes, Moseley.” (Haig Homes is a charity providing housing for ex-servicemen).  He was first elected as a Coalition Unionist in a by-election on 4 March 1921 and served until the 1950 United Kingdom general election. He then moved to the House of Lords as Sir Patrick Hannon.

Life

At all times a devout catholic and a champion of the poor his generosity was legendary while his sheer intellectual ability, applied with an unyielding will, won him worldwide influence and prestige. He funded part of the rebuilding of St. Dunstan’s Roman Catholic Church in Kings Heath and was the treasurer of the Apostleship of the Sea, an agency of the Catholic Church in support of seafarers. He was the administrative initiator of the Imperial Pioneers, later the British Commonwealth Union, and his talents even passed into Birmingham sports as the president of Aston VillaAston Villa F.C. The club won the FA Cup during his tenure in 1957. He had an even more successful business career, being chairman, of amongst other companies, B.S.A and Jaguar."

The New York Times recalled his unique ambitions: “For half a century he was an aggressive salesman for the Empire and the Commonwealth”. He led many campaigns to aid British world trade as president of the National Union of Manufacturers from 1935 – 1953. Sir Patrick was knighted in 1946 and, having survived a Labour landslide in 1945, retired from the House, undefeated, in 1950.

He died in London on 10 January 1963.
The obituary in the Catholic Herald paid tribute to his youthful thirst for education. “Sir Patrick learned early the need to acquire knowledge, as a means to economic release from subjection to poverty. He delighted in learning. Regularly in boyhood, he tramped five miles over the Curlew Mountains to Deer Park School to receive instruction in physics. He read in every subject. His poems and essays were printed in numerous papers in Ireland.” Sir Patrick’s business acumen was duly noted in the tribute but it also touched on his kind spirit. “His astonishing success in politics was equaled in big business. Sheer intellectual prowess applied with unbroken will won him worldwide influence and prestige. He was the most generous of men, an imperturbable companion, always warm-hearted and witty.”

Bibliography
Papers of Sir Patrick Joseph Henry Hannon MP (1874-1963), UK Parliament Archives Catalogue, Retrieved 2008-07-16
"Hannon, Sir Patrick Joseph Henry" (2008) Who Was Who 1897-2007, Retrieved 16 July 2008
F. W. S. Craig, Chronology of British Parliamentary By-elections 1833-1987
 Martin Pugh, 'Hurrah for the Blackshirts!': Fascists and Fascism in Britain between the Wars, London: Pimlico, 2006

External links 
 
 Patrick Hannon's autobiographical notes at Senate House Library, University of London
Parliamentary Archives, Papers of Sir Patrick Joseph Henry Hannon MP (1874-1963)

1874 births
1963 deaths
20th-century Anglo-Irish people
English industrialists
UK MPs 1918–1922
UK MPs 1922–1923
UK MPs 1923–1924
UK MPs 1924–1929
UK MPs 1929–1931
UK MPs 1931–1935
UK MPs 1935–1945
UK MPs 1945–1950
Conservative Party (UK) MPs for English constituencies
Fellows of the Royal Geographical Society